The 2005–06 Gamma Ethniki was the 23rd season since the official establishment of the third tier of Greek football in 1983.  Asteras Tripolis and Agrotikos Asteras were crowned champions in Southern and Northern Group respectively, thus winning promotion to Beta Ethniki. Ethnikos Piraeus, Messiniakos, PAS Giannina and Panthrakikos also won promotion due to expansion of Beta Ethniki from 16 to 18 teams.

Keratsini, Ionia 2000 Chania, Achaiki, Kozani and Ptolemaida were relegated to Delta Ethniki.

Southern Group

League table

Northern Group

League table

References

Third level Greek football league seasons
3
Greece